Marine Biology is a peer-reviewed scientific journal covering research on all aspects of marine biology. The journal was established in 1967 and is published monthly by Springer Science+Business Media. The editor-in-chief is Ulrich Sommer (Helmholtz Centre for Ocean Research). According to the Journal Citation Reports, the journal has a 2014 impact factor of 2.391.

References

External links 
 

Biology journals
Springer Science+Business Media academic journals
English-language journals
Publications established in 1967
Marine biology
Monthly journals
Hybrid open access journals